Susanne Ekman (born 4 December 1978) is a Swedish former alpine skier who competed in the 2002 Winter Olympics.

External links
 sports-reference.com

1978 births
Living people
Swedish female alpine skiers
Olympic alpine skiers of Sweden
Alpine skiers at the 2002 Winter Olympics
Universiade medalists in alpine skiing
Universiade gold medalists for Sweden
Competitors at the 1999 Winter Universiade
21st-century Swedish women